The County of Barrhead No. 11 is a municipal district in north central Alberta, Canada. It is located northwest of Edmonton and is in Census Division No. 13.

Geography

Communities and localities 

The following urban municipalities are surrounded by the County of Barrhead No. 11.
Cities
none
Towns
Barrhead
Villages
none
Summer villages
none

The following hamlets are located within the County of Barrhead No. 11.
Hamlets
Campsie
Manola
Neerlandia
Thunder Lake

The following localities are located within the County of Barrhead No. 11.
Localities 

Belvedere
Bloomsbury
Cam-Bar Estates
Camp Creek
Campsie Cove
Dunstable
Düsseldorf
Freedom
Gardenview
Greendale Subdivision
Highridge
Holmes Crossing
Idle Hours
Lawton
Lightning Bay
Lunnford

Mahar Subdivision
Meadowview
Mellowdale
Moonlight Bay Estates
Moose Wallow
Mosside
Mystery Lake
Naples
Park La Nonne
Roselea
Sion
Stewartfield
Summerlea
Tiger Lily
Vega

Demographics 

In the 2016 Census of Population conducted by Statistics Canada, the County of Barrhead No. 11 had a population of 6,288 living in 2,298 of its 2,830 total private dwellings, a  change from its 2011 population of 6,096.

Attractions 
Parks: Thunder Lake Provincial Park, Holmes Crossing Recreation Area, Klondike Ferry Park
Dolberg Lake Campground, Homesteaders Walking Trail
Lakes: Clear Lake, Lac la Nonne / Elks Beach, Peanut Lake
Sport Venues in Barrhead: Swimming Pool, Curling Rink, Rodeo Grounds, Tennis Courts
Ice hockey: Barrhead Agrena
Golf: Barrhead Golf Course, Paddle River Golf Course
Off-Road Riding: Barry’s Ultra Motorsports Park (BUMP)
Bowling: Blue Heron Bowl
Ski: Misty Ridge Ski Hill

Education 
The county is within the Pembina Hills Public Schools, which formed in 1995 as a merger of three school districts.

See also 
List of communities in Alberta
List of municipal districts in Alberta

References

External links 

 
Barrhead